Kerinov Grm is a settlement in the Municipality of Krško in southeastern Slovenia. It was established as an autonomous settlement in 2010. Kerinov Grm is a Romani settlement. A museum of Romani culture named the Old House opened in April 2013 and there is a preschool in the settlement for Romani children.

References

External links
 Kerinov Grm on Geopedia

Populated places in the Municipality of Krško
2010 establishments in Slovenia
Populated places established in 2010
Romani communities in Slovenia